Reginald Hewlett (12 August 1885 – 7 May 1950) was an English cricketer. He played for Gloucestershire between 1909 and 1922.

References

1885 births
1950 deaths
English cricketers
Gloucestershire cricketers
Cricketers from Bristol